K.K. Soundar (1925-2003) was a Tamil film actor. He has done character roles in many Tamil movies from the 1950s till the 1990s.

Filmography 
This is a partial filmography. You can expand it.

1930s

1950s

1960s

1970s

1980s

1990s

2000s

Tamil male actors
2003 deaths
Tamil male television actors
1925 births